Beyond the aXis of Truth 2 (simplified Chinese: 法医X档案 2) is a Singaporean Chinese drama which was telecasted on Singapore's free-to-air channel, MediaCorp Channel 8. This drama serial consists of 20 episodes and picks up from where the first series left off. It stars Edmund Chen, Ivy Lee, Ye Shipin, Nick Shen & Stella Ng as the casts of the second installment.

Edmund Chen and Ivy Lee reprise their roles respectively as a forensic pathologist who believes in supernatural science and a police superintendent who questions the existence of unexplainable forces. Together they tackle six mind-blowing cases involving time-travel, human cloning, a man with a half-brain, electricity-zapping red-haired women, latent genes and plant-human hybrids.

Synopsis
Case 1: A young artist (Guo Liang) travels back in time, bringing a modern phone with him. Falling in love with a woman, this relationship along with a series of misunderstandings bring about a murderous scheme concocted by his student. Back in the modern day, Wu Pinyu (Ivy Lee) is contacted by her long deceased mother through the same phone belonging to the artist, causing her and Xueming (Edmund Chen) to discover that they were communicating through time itself...

Case 2: A Frankenstein-based story with a twist - Professor Roland appear to be a respected doctor on the surface; in reality, he and his assistant Ye Zhongxing (Qi Yuwu) have been using illegal cloning to harvest organs for patients in desperate need of transplants. Zhongxing is morally conflicted about his actions and eventually decides to flee with Roland's personal clone (played by Rui En)), one created to replace his own wife. This, coupled with the police's discovery of several dead clones in an abandoned truck, kicks off a series of volatile events as Roland tries to get his personal clone back...

Case 3: When he was young, Zhuge Fei accidentally injures his childhood friend Kong Zhichong at a playground. The injury was so severe that Zhichong was left paralyzed with half a brain left, leaving Fei extremely guilt-ridden ever since. In the present day, a mysterious and gruesome suicide at a restaurant leads to the team learning that Zhichong's injury has somehow caused him to gain powerful but uncontrollable psychic abilities. Due to how dangerous his powers are and to keep him safe, his father (Zhu Houren) has been hiding him in his house, but his brother (Roy Chiu) keeps sneaking him out to give him a normal life, inadvertently causing more deaths and accidents...

Case 4: Fighting over a mysterious inheritance becomes deadly. Seven red-haired women, poised to inherit a strange fortune, are murdered one after another, with only three left, with two already known to the police and the last one's whereabouts currently unknown. It is later discovered that electricity literally runs within the hairs as people start turning up electrocuted to death. An unscrupulous journalist, determined to discover the truth by any means necessary, ends up dead as well, but the police quickly discovers that someone else is also involved in the murders, as he had been bludgeoned to death instead of being electrocuted.

The last surviving heir is later revealed to be one of the team's investigators, Zhou Xingxing (Stella Ng), who ultimately inherits the fortune due to the deaths of the other two.

Case 5: A wedding turns into tragedy when the groom (Huang Yiliang) suddenly rejects his bride upon laying eyes on Pinyu, causing her to end up in a coma when she attempts suicide out of grief. The wedding guests are then treated to another shock when the young daughter of two guests suddenly bites her pet dog to death and starts eating it raw. All the cases link back to a psychiatrist Li Zhijian (Rayson Tan) who believes he can bring out a person's latent genes of their past life. Even more disturbingly, children are going missing and suspicion falls upon one of Zhijian's patients. Just when the investigation becomes complicated, Xueming is shot right in front of Pinyu...

Case 6: What seemed to be ecoterrorism takes a turn for the strange when several deaths involving plants attacking humans are reported, causing Xueming to remember his lost love Li Yiwen. He and Pinyu are stunned when they come across Chen Meishan (Priscelia Chan), an ecology conservation activist who looks exactly like Yiwen, but she is wary of the two while a mysterious figure (Zen Chong) lurks in the shadows, using his ability to manipulate plants to commit more murders. This is a continuation of the last arc of the first season.

Cast
Edmund Chen as Chen Xueming
Ivy Lee as Wu Pinyu
Nick Shen as Zhuge Fei
Stella Ng as Zhou Xingxing / Xing Shufen 
Chen Shucheng as Wu Mingwei
Ye Shipin as Song Guo'en

Other cast
Guo Liang as Li Weizhong
Jacelyn Tay as Wu Sang
Wang Yuqing as Prof Lawrence
Qi Yuwu as Ye Zhongxin
Rui En as Fang Xiuxiu
Julian Hee as Kong Zhichong
Zhu Houren as Kong Xiaotian
Roy Chiu as Kong Zhijie
Joey Swee as Ning Xiaorou "Ah Moon"
Jaime Teo as Red
Lin Meijiao as Susan Tang
Rayson Tan as Li Zhijian
Huang Yiliang as Wu Chenyu
Zheng Geping as Kent
Priscelia Chan as Chen Meishan / Amura / Ke'er
Zen Chong as Woody / Eldoras

Awards & Nominations

See also
 List of programmes broadcast by Mediacorp Channel 8

References

Singapore Chinese dramas
2005 Singaporean television series debuts
2005 Singaporean television series endings
2005 Singaporean television seasons
Channel 8 (Singapore) original programming